Matthew Todd may refer to:

 Matthew Todd (cricketer), (born 1983) English cricketer
 Matthew Todd (chemist), (born 1973) British chemist
 Matthew Todd (footballer), Scottish footballer
 Matty Todd (1924–2020), British submariner
 Matthew Todd (writer), British writer